The Guaraúna River is a river of Paraná state in southeastern Brazil. It is a tributary of the Tibagi River.

See also
List of rivers of Paraná

References

Rivers of Paraná (state)